Respawn may refer to:

 Respawn, in gaming, the re-creation of a character, NPC or item after its death or destruction
 "Respawn" (30 Rock), an episode from the American television comedy series 30 Rock
 Respawn Entertainment, an American video game development studio

See also
 Spawn (disambiguation)